RSS Valiant (91) is the fourth ship of the Victory-class corvette of the Republic of Singapore Navy.

Construction and career 
Valiant was launched on 22 July 1989 by ST Engineering and was commissioned on 25 May 1991.

Exercise Pelican 2015 
Singapore and Brunei concluded their flagship bilateral naval exercise on 27 November. Exercise Pelican ran from 23 to 27 November 2015, hosted by the Republic of Singapore Navy. The exercise featured RSS Stalwart, RSS Valiant, KDB Darussalam and KDB Darulehsan.

On 6 April 2018, RSS Supreme and RSS Valiant underwent alongside USS Sampson and USS Theodore Roosevelt off Singapore.

References 

== External links ==

1989 ships
Ships built in Singapore
Victory-class corvettes